The King Ludwig Oak (in , and also Königseiche, Tausendjährige Eiche, and until the middle of the 19th century, Stolze Eiche) is an oak tree recognised as a natural monument in the Staatsbad Brückenau, a state-run spa and park  west of Bad Brückenau in the German state of Bavaria. The German Tree Archive counts the oak among the trees of national importance (National bedeutsamer Baum, NBB).

Estimates of its age range between 370 and 700 years. It is named after King Ludwig I, who frequented it during his numerous spa stays at the Staatsbad Brückenau. The oak has been described and depicted many times since 1780. Many domestic aristocrats and monarchs from abroad who were staying in Brückenau for the cure visited the oak.

Location
Until the 20th century, the spa gardens of Brückenau surrounded the tree. A hiking trail with information boards leads past the oak. Almost the entire spa area can be seen from its elevated position. In between, state road 3180 runs from Staatsbad to the  district.

King Ludwig I resided at the Fürstenhof during his spa stays. Built in 1775 as the summer residence of Prince-Bishop Heinrich von Bibra, the Fürstenhof is now the Fürstenhof Palace Hotel. To the north, there is a small zoo in the old castle nursery and to the east is a herb garden. Several villas and a Protestant church were built to the west around 1900.

Description
The Lower Nature Conservation Authority of the Bad Kissingen district listed the oak, known as the royal oak, as a natural monument on March 2, 1987, with the number 672-N/009. The royal oak appears extremely asymmetrical in the lower part of the crown. In the past, the surrounding area served the spa guests as a place to celebrate, play, dance, and rest. Over 100 seats could be arranged in the  area underneath the foliage. In order not to further burden the oak, no more festivals are held there.

They lie on three iron rods and two wooden poles to relieve the pressure from their mass. It is inclined at about 20 degrees in the direction at which most of the main horizontal branches branch off. Oaks supported by poles are extremely rare, in contrast to the drawn and supported dance linden trees. The Femeiche in Erle (about  trunk circumference), the Lenzeiche near Sichertshausen (about  trunk circumference), and the royal oak are the only supported oaks of this size in Germany. A hundred years ago it still had more than ten supports and the height of its growth; the trunk was still completely closed, and the crown densely branched. Six branches at about the same height formed a wreath. It is not known when the supports were first installed. King Ludwig I campaigned for the care of the oak during his spa stays in Brückenau. Presumably, the first supports were installed then, the oldest description of which dates from 1838.

When the longest horizontal branch at  broke out in the 1960s, a deep gap formed in the trunk on the north side. The branch had been provided with an iron ring that was supposed to hold it together. The ring had grown into the branch until it finally burst and 84 annual rings were counted around the ingrown iron ring.

It is closed with a close-knit wire mesh. Some of the supported old branches are also hollow, and the upper walls are partly missing, so they consist only of a half-shell made of bark material. In addition to the supports, the oak is secured with a crown made up of about 20 steel cables that radiate from the main axis to the horizontal side branches. It is a static crown protection in which the branches are braced to the trunk by the steel cables. The ropes are attached to threaded rods that have been drilled through the branches and lead to the partially ingrown retaining eyes that are screwed into the trunk. Since the hot summer of 2003, the previously small amount of dead wood, which is regularly cut out, has increased; the oak's declining vitality noticeable.

Inscriptions

A wooden plaque with the following inscription is attached to the oak (English translation from German):

The inscription on the previous plaque read (in German):

Trunk diameter

The largest oak is at the zoo near Ivenack.

Age

Different information is available about the oak's age. The Lower Nature Conservation Authority estimates it to be 400–600 years old. In 2000, the forest scientist, Hans Joachim Fröhlich estimated its age at 700 years and the German Tree Archive in 2009 estimated it to be between 360 and 420 years old. Sometimes its age is given at 1000 or even 1500 years; however, this is likely to be too high. Since the oldest wood is missing in the centre of the trunk, annual ring counting with the help of a drill core or by drilling resistance measurement using a resistograph, and radiocarbon dating is impossible. The actual age can only be estimated roughly based on the size of the trunk and convention. The count on a branch trimmed in the outer crown area in 2007, which had solid wood to the middle, resulted in around 300 annual rings. However, it is not known when the oak formed this branch. About 120 years ago, there was an abrupt change in the annual ring width. Since then, the annual rings are only about half as far apart from one another as before.

History

Oldest traditions

In 1747, the Fulda Prince Abbot Amand von Buseck founded the spa following the discovery of the medicinal properties of the waters. This was the beginning of the spa business at Fulda. When the spa's gardens were designed, an open space was left around the oak tree, to which one of the main paths leads. The second half of the 18th century saw the first heyday of the spa business, as is evident from numerous descriptions. The oak is mentioned and depicted in many of these reports. On an engraving by the artist Egid Verhelst from 1780, the oak is shown with a pointed, high-reaching crown. This is the oldest known pictorial representation of the tree. The oldest description, in which it is referred to as a "proud oak", also comes from the year 1780. The spa's doctor, Melchior Adam Weikard, wrote at that time:

Leopold Friedrich Günther von Goeckingk, a poet, wrote in 1782 in the Deutsches Museum, a magazine for literature, art, and public life:

Two years later, in 1784, he wrote in the monthly journal Journal von und für Deutschland:

The oak can be recognized on other copper engravings from the state bath from the end of the 18th and the following centuries. A revised engraving by Verhelst from 1790 shows it with a large, hemispherical crown. Christian von Eggers wrote in 1810 in Journey through Franconia, Bavaria, Austria, Prussia and Saxony about his journey to Brückenau in 1804:

Ludwig era

After several changes of rulership, Brückenau was awarded to the Kingdom of Bavaria by the Congress of Vienna in 1816. One of the first views of the Bavarian spa from 1817/1818 was made by the architectural painter Domenico Quaglio, who depicted the oak with a large crown in a watercolour. In 1818, Crown Prince Ludwig of Bavaria visited the state bath for the first time. He was a patron of the arts and sciences and in the same year placed the deciduous forests and especially the old oaks in the Staatsbad Brückenau under his special protection. During his total of 26 often months-long spa stays between 1818 and 1862 in Brückenau (from 1825 as King of Bavaria), he regularly visited the royal oak and rested under it. In 1822, the doctor Johann Evangelist Wetzler wrote in Gesundbrunnen and Heilbäder:

On July 29, 1840, Ludwig I, who was later accompanied by his grandson, the later King of Bavaria and art lover Ludwig II , wrote the poem "Under the oak tree in the Bad Brückenau" (in ):

During the first comprehensive survey in the then Kingdom of Bavaria in the years 1808 to 1853, the oak was registered on the Bad Brückenau—NW CIV 56 original sheet from November 1848 with the field number 284 and the name Königseiche.

The spa in Brückenau enjoyed a second heyday from the middle to the end of the 19th century, when numerous monarchs from abroad came for the cure and visited the tree. King Maximilian II stayed under the oak in 1856 and Queen Amalie of Greece in 1873 during their longer spa stays in Brückenau. Other visitors to the spa and the oak in 1857 were the widow of the Tsarina Alexandra Feodorovna, the Tsarina Marija Alexandrovna, and the Queen of Bavaria, Marie Friederike.

The gardener and garden writer Hermann Jäger wrote in the newspaper in 1861 to disseminate scientific knowledge and view of nature for readers of all levels:

Luitpold period
In 1897, Prince Regent Luitpold unveiled a memorial in Brückenau in honour of his father Ludwig I. At the Königseiche, he drank a glass of wine toasting a successful future for Brückenau. Empress Elisabeth of Austria also stayed there for four weeks in 1898. The first detailed description of the oak dates from 1900. The tree photographer Friedrich Stützer, inspector of the royal Bavarian state railway in Munich, wrote in his tree book The largest, oldest or otherwise strange trees in Bavaria in words and pictures:

The oak was shown on postcards from around 1900. At the turn of the century and in the years after, the number of supports used in the tree fluctuated. In 1912 there were 13, at times up to 16, so significantly more than today with five. In Communications from the German Dendrological Society of 1912, August Siebert wrote:

In recent times

In Schneider's Rhönführer from 1928:

In the last 50 years, tree care measures have been carried out several times on the oak. The rotten and fungus-infested wood was removed from the hollow trunk. Then it was dexelled, the rest smoothed and the surface treated with fungicidal agents. To stabilize the trunk, several intersecting threaded rods with over-pipes were attached in the cavity. The crown came with a crown lock provided, branches were shortened and trimmed, and wound closure agents were applied to cut surfaces. Three of the wooden supports were replaced by iron bars with which the branches are connected by threaded bars with open arches. A bench around the trunk from the 19th century was removed to prevent further soil compaction in the root area.

In 1996, the tree was renovated and a decrease in vitality and a high proportion of dead wood were found. A specialist company carried out crown maintenance, renewed the supports, and installed a new support. Old wounds and rotten areas were checked and the anchorages of the holding ropes checked. At the same time, the soil type was determined and a nutrient analysis was carried out. A residual wall thickness measurement was carried out on a hollow, thick branch. The oak suffered greatly from the hot (the warmest temperatures in at least 250 years) and partly dry summer of 2003. The branches' vitality, which had been good up to that point, has continued to decline. Several branches died in the outer crown area. This is probably because of the lowering of the groundwater level and the resulting water shortage. To counteract decay, the tree disc is now fertilized annually with a soil activator to create more favorable conditions for the roots via the soil structure. In dry periods, the oak is watered as much as is necessary. Dead branches were removed in the winter of 2005/2006, the crown was trimmed, and the security of its limbs checked.

In the spring of 2006, the state spa's nursery planted special medicinal mushrooms (Mycorrhiza) in the root area. Since 2008, the soil in the crown area has been covered with a layer of leaves in autumn. These remain there all year round to prevent the upper soil layers from drying out. Because of the continuing decline in the tree's vitality, further maintenance measures were carried out by a specialist company in spring 2009. Dead branches were again removed and the steel cable connections checked. In addition, the crown was secured using the BOA system. With this newer form of branch securing, the laterally protruding branches were tied to one or more main branches using rope connections that end in loops, so that the load is distributed within the tree. In September 2012, ten new steel supports were installed. Two of the previous wooden supports remain. The branches are attached to the supports with straps, the contact surface of which is coated with rubber. Gaps in the rubber allow the water to drain off better. Some of the supports have a threaded section and can be readjusted.

References

External links

 König-Ludwig-Eiche in the directory of monumental oaks
 
 German Tree archive

Bad Kissingen (district)
Individual oak trees
Individual trees in Germany
Natural monuments in Bavaria